r/Buttcoin is a subreddit community that is part of Reddit. It has criticized cryptocurrencies and celebrates lower exchange rates of them.

References 

Buttcoin